Grow or GROW may refer to:

 Growth (disambiguation), an increase in some quantity over time or a measure of some principal
 GROW model, a technique for problem solving or goal setting
 Graphical ROMable Object Windows, a windowing system that was developed into the MarioNet split web browser

People
 C. Scott Grow (born 1948), a general authority in The Church of Jesus Christ of Latter-day Saints
 Carol Grow (born 1971), American beauty queen, model, and actress
 Erica Grow, (born 1980), American meteorologist and television reporter
 Galusha A. Grow (1823–1907), American politician
 Henry Grow (1817–1891), American civil engineer
 Lloyd Grow (1903–1979), American football and basketball coach
 Malcolm C. Grow (1887–1960), first Surgeon General of the United States Air Force
 Matthew Grow (born 1977), American historian
 Monty Grow (born 1971), American football player
 Robert W. Grow (1895–1985), US Army officer
 Roy Grow (1941–2013), American professor of international relations
 GROW Vasu, Ayinoor Vasu (born 1930), Indian leader of the Gwalior Rayons Workers' Organisation (GROW)

Places
 Grow, Texas
 Grow, Wisconsin

Organizations
 GROW (support group), a mental health peer support group and mutual aid organization
 Grow (company), a financial technology company based in Vancouver, Canada
 Grow Jogos e Brinquedos, a Brazilian company that markets toys and board games

Arts and entertainment
 The Grow, a 2012 Chinese film
 "Grow" (Law & Order: Criminal Intent), a television episode
 GROW (series), a series of Flash-based indie video games
 Grow (album), by Chon, 2015
 Grow, an EP by Kolby Koloff, or the title song, 2015
 "Grow" (Jeangu Macrooy song), 2020
 "Grow", a song by Andy Grammer from The Good Parts, 2017
 "Grow", a song by Frances from Things I've Never Said, 2017
 "Grow", a song by Joakim Lundell, 2018
 "Grow", a song by Kubb from Mother, 2005

See also
 
 
 Grower (disambiguation)